Mount Masaraga is a stratovolcano located in Ligao City in the province of Albay, in the Bicol region, on Luzon Island, in the Philippines.

Physical features
Mount Masaraga is a forested, sharp-topped, mountain with an elevation of  asl. It is adjacent and the closest to the perfect cone of Mayon Volcano.

Eruptions
There are no historical eruptions from the volcano with the last eruptive activity dated as Holocene as reported by the Global Volcanism Program. Thick lava flows from that period are present on the flanks of Mount Masaraga, an understudied volcano in the Philippines.

Geology
Rock type found on the mountain is andesite trending to rhyolite. Tectonically, Masaraga is part of the Bicol Volcanic Chain of volcanoes and part of the Pacific ring of fire.

Listings
The Philippine Institute of Volcanology and Seismology (PHIVOLCS) lists the mountain as one of the inactive volcanoes of the Philippines.

See also
 List of volcanoes in the Philippines

References

External links
 Inactive Volcanoes page (archived) 
 

Stratovolcanoes of the Philippines
Subduction volcanoes
Volcanoes of Luzon
Mountains of the Philippines
Landforms of Albay
Holocene stratovolcanoes